Fiambalá is a town in the department of Tinogasta, located in the west part of Catamarca Province, Argentina. It is located at the beginning of the Altiplano at 1.505 m.a.s.l. and 320 km from the capital of Catamarca, San Fernando del Valle de Catamarca. It is situated along the Abaucán and La Troya rivers.

Gallery

See also

 San Francisco Pass
 Duna Federico Kirbus

External links
Fiambalá.Gov.Ar

Populated places in Catamarca Province
Populated places established in 1702
1702 establishments in the Spanish Empire
Municipalities of Argentina